"Magic" (stylized in all caps) is a song by Japanese singer-songwriter Rina Aiuchi. It was released on 21 October 2009 through Giza Studio, as the second single from her second compilation album All Singles Best: Thanx 10th Anniversary. The single reached number seventeen in Japan and has sold over 8,590 copies nationwide. The song served as the theme songs to the Japanese anime television series, Case Closed.

Track listing

Charts

Certification and sales

|-
! scope="row"| Japan (RIAJ)
| 
| 8,590
|-
|}

Release history

References

2009 singles
2009 songs
J-pop songs
Song recordings produced by Daiko Nagato
Songs written by Aika Ohno
Songs written by Rina Aiuchi